Mark Anthony Greene, known by his stage name Young Scrap is an American recording artist, rapper and songwriter. His single titled "Love L.A" off his Faded Ambition album charted at No. 18 on the Billboard Twitter Top Tracks during the week of July 12, 2014. Young Scrap is also credited to have written V.I.C.'s song titled "Twerk It" which charted at No. 69 on the Billboard Hot R&B/Hip-Hop Songs. and V.I.C "Wobble"

Early life and career
Young Scrap performed with notable acts like Debbie Allen and Savion Glover until he moved to Maryland. While in his second year in high school, he released his first album titled Puppy Power under his uncle's record label and in 2008 he signed a recording contract with Universal Music Group under which he released the single "The Melody" which was positively received among music fans.

On September 12, Young Scrap released the first of his "Music We Can Fuck To" series titled Music We Can Fuck Too which featured guest appearances from notable rappers like Yo Gotti and V.I.C. His Jahlil Beats-produced single titled "Love L.A" was widely received and charted at No. 18 during the week of July 12, 2016, on the Billboard Twitter Top Tracks. On August 4, 2016, he released a mixtape titled Faded Ambition with guest appearance from Lil Wayne and music production from popularly producers like DJ Mustard and Jahlil Beats. On June 20, 2016, Young Scrap released Trill and B, a project he started recording since 2014. He also revealed to have scrapped over 300 songs to get the proper balance in the musical production of the album.

Discography

Album

Mixtapes

EPs

Selected singles

References

External links

Living people
American hip hop musicians
Hardcore hip hop artists
African-American male rappers
American male songwriters
21st-century American rappers
21st-century American male musicians
African-American songwriters
21st-century African-American musicians
20th-century African-American people
Year of birth missing (living people)